Pingyang station is a subway station in Changsha, Hunan, China, operated by the Changsha subway operator Changsha Metro.

Layout
Pingyang has one island platform.

History
The station opened on 26 May 2019.

Surrounding area
 Hengda International Plaza 
 Lituo School

References

Railway stations in Hunan
Railway stations in China  opened in 2019